Xinhua Sports & Entertainment Limited (XSEL) was a Chinese media company which was delisted in 2011, as well as the arrest of top management of the firm. The company was known as Xinhua Finance Media Limited until 2009.

In 2007 the state-owned enterprise Xinhua News Agency even declared that they have no relation with XSEL's parent company Xinhua Finance.

In 2013 Fredy Bush, former CEO was jailed.

History 

Xinhua Finance Media Limited was incorporated in the Cayman Islands on 7 November 2005. The company was listed in NASDAQ in March 2007.

On March 2, 2009, Xinhua Finance Media has changed its name to "Xinhua Sports & Entertainment Limited" (XSEL).

In 2011, follow the exposure of the real financial condition of the company which ended as liquidation, Lynn Tilton sued former friend and CEO of XSEL, Fredy Bush, for fraud.

References

External links 
Xinhua Finance Media official website
Xinhua Sports & Entertainment official website

Mass media companies of China
Companies formerly listed on the Nasdaq
Companies based in Beijing